Picenum was a region of ancient  Italy. The name is an exonym assigned by the Romans, who conquered and incorporated it into the Roman Republic. Picenum was Regio V in the Augustan territorial organization of Roman Italy. Picenum was also the birthplace of such Roman notables as Pompey the Great and his father, Pompeius Strabo. It was in what is now Marche and the northern part of Abruzzo. The Piceni or Picentes were the native population of Picenum, but they were not of uniform ethnicity. They maintained a religious centre in Cupra Marittima, in honor of the goddess Cupra.

Historical geography
Picenum and the Picentes were described in some detail by the Roman geographers.

Strabo
Strabo places Picenum between the Apennines and the Adriatic Sea from the mouth of the Aesis River southward to Castrum at the mouth of the Truentinus River, some 800 stadia, which is  using 185 m/stadion. For cities he includes from north to south Ancona, Auxumum, Septempeda (San Severino Marche), Pneuentia, Potentia, Firmum Picenum with port at Castellum (Porto di Fermo), Cupra Maritima (Cupra Marittima and Grottammare), Truentum on the Truentinus (Tronto) and finally Castrum Novum and Matrinum on the Matrinus (Piomba), south of Silvi in Abruzzo. This is a list of coastal communities. Strabo also mentions Adria (Atri, Italy) and Asculum Picenum (Ascoli Piceno) in the interior. The width of Picenum inland varies irregularly, he says.

History
First settled at the beginning of the Iron Age (1200BC1BC), Picenum later became one of the eleven districts of Italy. The three interior towns of the region possessed an urban layout and appeared to be economically successful, so it is unknown what caused this region to decline in later years.  The Liburnians had colonies at the western Adriatic coast, especially in region of Picenum, from the beginning of the Iron Age. From the 9th to the 6th century there was certain koine - cultural unity in the Adriatic, with the general Liburninan seal, whose naval supremacy meant both political and economical authority in the Adriatic Sea through several centuries.

In 268 BC the consuls Appius Claudius Russus and Publius Sempronius Sophus conducted a pincer operation against Picenum. The Picentes, who were then Roman allies, had rebelled. Part of the population was deported and those who were not were given Roman citizenship without the right to vote. Thus, Picenum was annexed, except for the city of Ausculum, which was considered an allied city. To keep it under control, the colony of Firmum was established nearby in 264 BC.

According to Polybius (Histories 2:21), during the consulship of Marcus Aemilius Lepidus (232BC), "the Romans divided among their citizens the territory in Gaul known as Picenum, from which they had ejected the Senones when they conquered them".

Picenum is best known for siding with Rome against Hannibal during the Punic Wars. It also became a Roman base during the Social War. Some Picentes remained loyal to Rome in the war, while others fought against them for the right of Roman citizenship. All Picentes were granted full Roman citizenship after the war.

In the Edict of Diocletian, it was mentioned that the wine from Picenum was considered the most expensive wine, together with Falerno. Vinum Hadrianum was produced in Picenum, in the city of Hatria or Hadria, the old name of Atri. This is also the same wine that Pliny considered one of the highly-rated wines, along with a few others.

Culture
Excavations performed in the late 19th century in Picenum give some insight into the region during the Iron Age.  Excavated tombs in Novilara of the Molaroni and Servici cemeteries show that the Piceni laid bodies in the ground wrapped in garments they had worn in life.

Warriors would be buried in the ground with a helmet, weapons and vessels for food and drinks.  Buried beads, bone, fibulae and amber seem to demonstrate that there was an active trade in the ninth and perhaps tenth centuries on the Adriatic coast, especially in the fields of amber and beads of glass paste. In women’s graves there is a large abundance of ornaments made of bronze and iron.

Origins of these items may also show that the Piceni may have looked to the south and east for development.

The warrior tombs seem to show that the Piceni were a war-like people. Every man’s grave contained more or less a complete outfit of a warrior, with the most frequent weapon being a spear.  Piceni swords appear to be imported from the Balkans.

Languages

South Picene, written in an unusual version of the Italic alphabet, has been identified as a Sabellic language that is neither Oscan nor Umbrian.

The undeciphered North Picene, also written in a form of the Old Italic alphabet, is probably not closely unrelated to South Picene. At present, it is generally assumed not to be an Italic language (although it may have belonged to another branch of the Indo-European languages).

Cities of the Regio V 
As reported by Pliny the Elder in his Naturalis Historia, 24 cities were placed in Regio V:

See also
Ancient peoples of Italy

References

Bibliography

External links
 

 
Ancient Abruzzo
History of le Marche